Afraz (also Romanized as Afrāz; also known as Afrār) is a village in Maskun Rural District, Jebalbarez District, Jiroft County, Kerman Province, Iran. At the 2006 census, its population was 135, in 34 families.

References 

Populated places in Jiroft County